Nedine adversa is a species of beetle in the family Cerambycidae. It was described by Pascoe in 1864. It is known from Java, Malaysia, Borneo and Sumatra.

References

Desmiphorini
Beetles described in 1864